is a Japanese manga artist who has created several works with a lesbian theme. These include Indigo Blue, the story of a young author discovering her sexuality, Free Soul, and Love My Life.

Career 
Her debut work was the short story "Sankakukei no dessert", published in Monthly LaLa in November 1984. 
Several of her works were serialized in the josei magazines Feel Young (published by Shodensha) and the now defunct Young You. Although some of her works have been published in France and in Italy, none of them have been officially released in English. A live-action version of her manga Love My Life, which she serialized in Feel Young from 2000 until 2001, was released in Japan in January 2007.

In the 2010s, she started publishing in the seinen manga magazine Comic Beam. Her manga Onnanoko ga Iru Basho wa, released in the magazine between 2021 and 2022, is nominated for the 2023 Tezuka Osamu Cultural Prize.

Works

References

External links
 Shodensha's profile for Ebine Yamaji

Interview with manga writer Ebine Yamaji   in Tokyo Wrestling

Living people
Manga artists
Women manga artists
Japanese female comics artists
Year of birth missing (living people)